Slippery Rock Area School District is a school district in Slippery Rock, Pennsylvania, U.S.A.

It operates Slippery Rock High School, as well as a middle school and two elementary schools: Moraine Elementary and Slippery Rock Area Elementary. The schools mascot is the Rockets. The district covers "approximately  that spreads from Harrisville, Mercer Twp. to Portersville, Muddy Creek Twp." The remaining of the eleven municipalities served are Worth Township, Prospect, Franklin Township, West Liberty, Brady Township, Slippery Rock, and Slippery Rock Township.

References

External links
 

School districts in Butler County, Pennsylvania